Shlanly (Şlanlı; , Şlanlă) is a rural locality (a selo) in Semyonkinsky Selsoviet, Aurgazinsky District, Bashkortostan, Russia. The population was 702 as of 2010. There are 5 streets.

Geography 
Shlanly is located 30 km southwest of Tolbazy (the district's administrative centre) by road. Abdullino is the nearest rural locality.

References 

Rural localities in Aurgazinsky District